The  is a group of Kofun period burial mounds located in the city of Sanuki, Kagawa Prefecture, on the island of Shikoku of Japan. The tumulus group was designated a National Historic Site in 2013, with the area under protection expanded in 2014.

Overview
The National Historic Site consist of nine burial mounds that were built from the early Kofun period to the early middle Kofun period in an area of 4.5 kilometers east–west and 3.5 kilometers north–south centered on the coastal area of ​​Tsuda Bay overlooking the Seto Inland Sea. This group of burial mounds was known in the Edo period, and there are records of archaeological excavations from the early twentieth century onwards. The earliest mounds are made from piled stones in a style unique to eastern Shikoku and are orientated to the east; however, later tumuli contain cylindrical haniwa and are orientated in a north–south direction. This indicates increasing political and cultural influences from the Kinai region.  The split bamboo-shaped sarcophagi at the Tsuda Kofun cluster was made from volcanic stone produced in this area, and the same volcanic stone sarcophagus have been found in the Kinai, Kibi, and Awa regions, which suggests a strong maritime connection. In the middle of the Kofun period, when the Tomita Chausuyama Kofun, the largest keyhole-shaped burial mound in Shikoku, appeared inland, the construction of burial mounds in the Tsuda site stopped. This clearly shows that a major political consolidation that occurred in the region during that period.

See also
List of Historic Sites of Japan (Kagawa)

References

External links
Sanuki City home page 

Kofun
Archaeological sites in Japan
History of Kagawa Prefecture
Sanuki, Kagawa
Historic Sites of Japan